The 1999 Nike Tour season ran from January 7 to October 24. The season consisted of 30 official money golf tournaments.  The top 15 players on the year-end money list earned their PGA Tour card for 2000.

Schedule
The following table lists official events during the 1999 season.

Money leaders
For full rankings, see 1999 Nike Tour graduates.

The money list was based on prize money won during the season, calculated in U.S. dollars. The top 15 players on the tour earned status to play on the 2000 PGA Tour.

Awards

See also
1999 Nike Tour graduates

Notes

Korn Ferry Tour seasons
Nike Tour